Manitoba Provincial Road 349 is a provincial road in the southwestern section of the Canadian province of Manitoba.

Route description
The route begins at PR 250 and terminates at PTH 10 south of Brandon.

PR 349 is a straight gravel road for its entire length.

History
In the early 1990s, the Manitoba government decommissioned a number of provincial secondary roads and returned the maintenance of these roads back to the rural municipalities. A section of the original PR 349 was included in this decommissioning.

Prior to this, PR 349 extended past its westbound terminus for  before terminating at PTH 21 south of Griswold.

After the decommissioning of this section, the road is known as Municipal Road Mile 50N.

References

349